Susurrus Station is an eclectic music project formed by the American artist Jason Breeden and Swedish musician Sara Johanne in 2003 in Stockholm, Sweden.  The songs vary considerably stylistically, and are sometimes densely packed with lyrics, lush instrumentation and sonic remnants of experimental music and blues.

Breeden and Johanne formed the independent record label AIO Soundings in 2006.  They play and record in several other projects as well, notably Pikara, billed as Johanne's solo project, and Nigh Chaparral, a collaborative recording series.  They also play in the rock band Zouaves, as well as the absurdist undertaking, Dead Cinema.

Discography 
 O.K. Carousal 2004
 (1,2) Unbuckle the Blue 2005
 Tinhorn Forlorn (ep) 2006
 Add a Day Going West 2009
 Antinomie 2012
 Clackamas Killer / Americanitis (split single with RLLRBLL) 2016
 Tinhorn Reborn (single) 2016
 Miss Anthropocene 2017
 Radio Free Memory (cover songs, scheduled 2018)

References

External links 
  
 Aio Soundings website 
 Myspace page 
 

Susurrus Station on Bandcamp

Swedish musical groups